List of communities in the Eastern Panhandle of West Virginia, arranged in alphabetical order. Incorporated municipalities are listed in bold. Asterisks (*) indicate a county seat.

 moundsville Mcmechen

A
Allensville
Antioch
Arden
Arkansas
Arthur
Augusta

B
Baker
Bakerton
Bardane
Barnes Mill
Barnum
Basore
Bass
Bath (Berkeley Springs)*
Baughman Settlement
Baxter
Bayard
Bean Settlement
Bedington
Berkeley
Berryville
Beryl
Bessemer
Bismarck
Blaine
Blair
Blairton
Bloomery, Hampshire County
Bloomery, Jefferson County
Blue Ridge Acres
Blues Beach
Bolivar
Brake
Brandywine
Browns Corner
Brushy Run
Bubbling Spring
Bunker Hill
Burlington
Burnt Factory

C
Cabins
Campbells
Capon Bridge
Capon Lake
Capon Springs
Capon Springs Station
Carpendale
Cave
Champwood
Charles Town*
Cherry Grove
Cherry Run
Circleville
Claysville
Cold Stream
Corporation of Ranson
Creekvale
Cross
Cunningham

D
Dahmer
Dans Run
Darkesville
Davis Ford
Deer Run
Delray
Dillons Run
Dobbin
Doe Gully
Donaldson
Dorcas
Douglas Grove
Dry Run
Duckwall
Duffields
Durgon

E
Egypt
Elk Garden
Emoryville
Engle
Entry

F
Fairfax
Falling Waters
Fame
Files Crossroad
Fisher
Flats
Forge Hill
Forks of Cacapon
Forman
Fort Ashby
Fort Run
Fort Seybert
Franklin*
Franklintown
Frenchburg

G
Ganotown
Georgetown
Gerrardstown
Glebe
Glengary
Good
Gormania
Grace
Great Cacapon
Green Ridge
Green Spring
Greenland
Greensburg
Greenwood
Grubbs Corner

H
Hainesville, Berkeley County
Hainesville, Hampshire County
Halltown
Hampshire
Hancock
Hanging Rock
Hansrote
Harper
Harpers Ferry
Hartmansville
Headsville
Hedgesville
Henry
Higginsville
High View
Holton
Hooks Mills
Hopeville
Hoy

I
Inkerman
Intermont
Inwood

J
Jamestown
Jericho
Jerome
Jimtown
Johnsons Mill
Johnsontown, Berkeley County
Johnsontown, Jefferson County
Jones Springs
Junction

K
Kabletown
Kearneysville
Kessel
Ketterman
Keyes Ferry Acres
Keyser*
Kirby
Kline

L
Lahmansville
Largent
Laurel Dale
Leetown
Lehew
Levels
Limestone
Lineburg
Little Cacapon
Little Georgetown
Loom
Lost City
Lost River

M
Macksville
Magnolia
Mannings
Markwood
Marlowe
Martinsburg*
Mathias
Maysville
McCauley
McNeill
Mechanicsburg
Mechanicstown
Mechlenberg Heights
Medley
Meyerstown
Middleway
Milam
Miles
Millbrook
Millen
Millville
Mitchell
Moatstown
Moler Crossroads
Moorefield*
Mount Storm
Mount Trimble
Mountain Mission
Moyers
Mozer

N
Neals Run
Needmore
Nero
Nethkin
New Creek
New Hope
Nipetown
Nollville
North Berkeley
North Mountain
North River Mills

O
Oak Flat
Oak Grove
Oakland
Oakmont
Okonoko
Old Arthur
Old Fields
Omps
Onego
Orleans Cross Roads

P
Pancake
Paw Paw
Patterson Creek
Perry
Peru
Petersburg*
Piedmont
Pikeside
Pin Oak
Pleasant Dale
Points
Propstburg
Purgitsville

R
Rada
Raven Rocks
Reedson
Reeses Mill
Ridersville
Ridge
Ridgedale
Ridgeley
Ridgeway
Rig
Rio
Rippon
Riverside
Riverton
Rock Gap
Rock Oak
Rocket Center
Rockland
Romney*
Ruckman
Ruddle
Russelldale

S
Scherr
Scrabble
Sector
Sedan
Seneca Rocks
Shanghai
Shanks
Shannondale
Shenandoah Junction
Shepherdstown
Shiloh
Short Gap
Silver Grove
Simoda
Sir Johns Run
Skeetersville
Skyline
Slanesville
Sleepy Creek
Smith Crossroads
South Branch Depot
Spring Mills
Springfield
Stohrs Crossroads
Stotlers Crossroads
Sugar Grove
Sulphur City
Summit Point
Swan Pond

T
Tablers Station
Tannery
Tarico Heights
Taylor
Teterton
Three Churches
Tomahawk

U
Unger
Union Corner
Upper Tract
Uvilla

V
Van Clevesville
Vance
Vanderlip
Vanville

W
Wagoner
Walnut Bottom
Wappocomo
Wardensville
Wheatland
Wiley Ford
Williamsport
Wilsonia
Winebrenners Crossroad
Woodmont
Woodrow
Wynkoop Spring

Y
Yellow Spring

Z
Zigler

See also 
West Virginia
List of cities in West Virginia
List of villages in West Virginia
List of census-designated places in West Virginia

Populated places in West Virginia
Populated places in Berkeley County, West Virginia
Populated places in Grant County, West Virginia
Populated places in Hampshire County, West Virginia
Populated places in Hardy County, West Virginia
Populated places in Jefferson County, West Virginia
Populated places in Mineral County, West Virginia
Populated places in Morgan County, West Virginia
Populated places in Pendleton County, West Virginia
Communities in the Eastern Panhandle of West Virginia, List of